Keep Up is the debut extended play (EP) by British YouTube personality and rapper KSI. It was released on 8 January 2016 through Island Records. The EP features guest appearances from Jme, Tiggs da Author, Lunar C, Nick Brewer, Randolph, Youngs Teflon, Sway and Scrufizzer. The EP charted at number 13 on the UK Albums Chart.

Singles 
The EP's title track, "Keep Up", which features British grime MC Jme, was released on 13 November 2015, followed by a music video two days later which has 40 million views. The song charted at number 45 on the UK Singles Chart and number 78 on the ARIA Australia Top 100.

A music video for "Kilimanjaro" was released on 25 December 2015, and it has 19 million views.

A music video for "Smoke 'N' Mirrors", featuring singer Tiggs Da Author and English rappers Lunar C and Nick Brewer, was released on 10 January 2016, and it has 9 million views.

Commercial performance 
The EP debuted at number 13 on the UK Albums Chart. During this week, it topped the iTunes UK Downloads Chart. The EP spent a total of five weeks on the UK R&B Albums Chart, debuting at number 1. The EP also charted at number 19 on the Billboard US R&B/Hip-Hop Albums Chart, number 14 on the Billboard US Rap Albums Chart, number 63 on the Billboard Canadian Albums Chart and number 23 on the RMNZ New Zealand Albums Chart.

Track listing
Credits adapted from Tidal.

Personnel 
Credits adapted from Tidal.
KSI – vocals, songwriter
Jme – vocals, songwriter (track 1)
Show N Prove – producer, songwriter (track 1)
Sway – producer (tracks 1–3), songwriter (tracks 1–4), engineer (tracks 1–5)
DJ Turkish – engineer (tracks 1, 2, 4, 5), mixer (tracks 1–5), producer and songwriter (tracks 2, 4)
Nicola Scordellis – additional vocals (track 1)
Oscar Lo Brutto – studio personnel (tracks 1, 2, 4, 5), guitar (track 2)
Andrew Mutambira – songwriter (tracks 2, 3), keyboard (track 2), producer (track 3)
Tiggs Da Author – vocals, songwriter (track 2)
Lunar C – vocals, songwriter (track 2)
Nick Brewer – vocals, songwriter (track 2)
Zagor – producer (tracks 3, 5), songwriter (tracks 3, 5)
Youngs Teflon – vocals, songwriter (track 4)
Scrufizzer – vocals, songwriter (track 4)
Randolph – vocals, songwriter (track 5)

Charts

Release history

See also 
 List of UK R&B Albums Chart number ones of 2016

References

Album chart usages for BillboardRandBHipHop
2016 debut EPs
Island Records EPs
KSI albums